K. V. Thangkabalu (born 15 March 1950) is a former member of the Lok Sabha of India. He represented the Salem constituency of Tamil Nadu and is a member of the Indian National Congress (INC) political party.

Early life
K. V. Thangkabalu was born in Kurichi, Salem district, Tamil Nadu.

Career
In July 2008, K. V. Thangkabalu was appointed president of the Tamil Nadu Congress Committee. He was the translator for Rahul Gandhi's campaign for lok shabha elections 2019  in Tamil Nadu

Personal life
He is married to T. Jayanthi and they have 1 son and 1 daughter. Thangkabalu is the Chairman of educational institutions Thangavelu Engineering College, TJ Institute of Technology, DA Vinci School of Design and Architecture under Ponniamman Education Trust.

References

External links 
 Members of Fourteenth Lok Sabha - Parliament of India website

Living people
Indian Tamil people
1950 births
India MPs 1991–1996
India MPs 2004–2009
Indian National Congress politicians from Tamil Nadu
People from Salem district
Lok Sabha members from Tamil Nadu
People from Dharmapuri district